Ann Hornaday is an American film critic. She has been film critic at The Washington Post since 2002 and is the author of Talking Pictures: How to Watch Movies (2017). In 2008, she was a finalist for the Pulitzer Prize for Criticism.

Early life
Hornaday grew up in Des Moines, Iowa. She attended Smith College, majoring in government; she graduated in 1982.

Career
After graduating from college, Hornaday moved to New York to become a freelance writer, contributing to Premiere, Us and Ms. magazines; at the latter, she also worked as a researcher and assistant to Gloria Steinem, a role she held from 1983 to 1985. Hornaday began contributing to the "Arts & Leisure" section of The New York Times, eventually going on to become film critic at the Austin American-Statesman in 1995. In 1997 she moved to The Baltimore Sun, then to The Washington Post in 2002, following the retirement of the Post'''s previous critic Rita Kempley. She has also written features for Working Woman and Self magazine.

In 2008, Hornaday was a finalist for the Pulitzer Prize for Criticism, with the prize committee citing "her perceptive movie reviews and essays, reflecting solid research and an easy, engaging style."

In 2017, Hornaday published Talking Pictures: How to Watch Movies. The book, a 304-page text published with Basic Books, draws on a series Hornaday began writing in 2009 for the Post, aimed at explaining the various specialized crafts in filmmaking – like sound, editing, cinematography – to a general audience. Hornaday approached it as a journalistic project, interviewing people working in a variety of roles in film to ask them to describe what they do as well as "what they wished audiences appreciated more about their work". In a review for The New York Times, Lisa Schwarzbaum described the book as "a pleasantly calm, eminently sensible, down-the-middle primer for the movie lover — amateur, professional or Twitter-centric orator — who would like to acquire and sharpen basic viewing skills."

Personal life
Hornaday lives in Baltimore.

References

External links
 Archive at The Washington Post''
  Ann Hornaday, "The 34 best political movies ever made" The Washington Post Jan. 23, 2020)

Living people
Year of birth missing (living people)
Smith College alumni
The Washington Post people
The Baltimore Sun people
Austin American-Statesman people
Writers from Des Moines, Iowa
American women film critics
National Society of Film Critics Members
American women journalists
20th-century American women writers
20th-century American journalists
21st-century American women writers
21st-century American journalists
Journalists from Iowa
American film critics